Nauta is a town in the northeastern part of Loreto Province in the Peruvian Amazon, roughly  south of Iquitos, the provincial capital. Nauta is located on the north bank of the Marañón River, a major tributary of the Upper Amazon, a few miles from the confluence of the Río Ucayali.

Established by Manuel Pacaya–Samiria, a leader of the Kokama people, following the 1830 uprising at the Jesuit mission of Lagunas, Nauta soon became the primary commercial hub of the Peruvian selva baja (known also as Omagua, or the Amazonian lowlands). In 1853, a Brazilian-owned paddle steamer made it all the way to Nauta.

Nauta is the primary destination of the only major road leading out of Iquitos, and is a staging area for several ecotourism lodges and ships on the Marañòn River. Boats take passengers from Nauta to the Pacaya-Samiria National Reserve.

Areas of interest 
Nauta is home to many unique features of nature. One example is the Sapi Sapi lagoon, where many exotic animals are found, such as the Yellow-spotted river turtle, the pirarucu fish, crocodiles, and the Arrau turtle. For those interested in seeing these animals up close, the option to take a boat around the lagoon is available. According to legend, there was once a mysterious mermaid that attracted locals with her clothing and natural beauty.

Another attraction is the Playa del Amor, located on the outskirts of Nauta and surrounded by jungle. Another highlight is the Quebrada Gasparito, another natural area that can be accessed by canoe and is known to be a relaxing getaway spot.

At the center of town is another attraction, the Plaza de Armas (see Plaza de Armas). It is characterized by the diversity of mythical statues made up by local residents that represent the native culture of the area. The Iglesia de Nauta, which is now used as a local parish theater, can also be found in the plaza, along with a school and bronze bust both named after Manuel Pacaya. A few streets past the plaza is the local marketplace where local customers and merchants from all over come to exchange goods.

Nauta is also the access point to the Pacaya-Samiria National Reserve. In order to enter the reserve, a permit must be purchased from the National Institute of Natural Resources (INRENA). Interested parties may enter by river through the community of 20 de febrero. Visitors will find that the Pacaya-Samiria National Reserve is one of the most biologically diverse places on the planet.

Culture 
In 2013, residents of Nauta created a children's rap video in the Kukama-Kukamiria dialect, in collaboration with Radio Ucamara. The local radio station has been involved in conserving the language for "a few years," and "started managing a school called Ikuar, with the goal of teaching the language through songs and traditional story telling."

References

Populated places in the Loreto Region
Upper Amazon